James Nelson (born 18 February 1982) is a British former professional tennis player.

Biography
A right-handed player from Newcastle, Nelson won the boys' doubles title at the 2000 US Open, partnering Lee Childs. It was the first title won by British players at the US Open for 32 years. The two players finished 2000 as the top ranked pair in the ITF year-end doubles rankings.

His only main draw appearance on the ATP Tour came in the doubles at the 2000 Brighton International.

Nelson played in the main draw of Wimbledon in both 2000 and 2001. At the 2000 Wimbledon Championships he was a wildcard pairing with Mark Hilton and they were beaten in a four-set first round match by Czechs Petr Pála and Pavel Vízner. He received another opportunity to compete in the men's doubles at the 2001 Wimbledon Championships, but he and partner Lee Childs were unable to get past their first round opponents, the Bryan brothers. Partnering Helen Crook, he also featured in the mixed doubles draw.

He retired from professional tennis at the age of 20.

Junior Grand Slam finals

Doubles: 1 (1 title)

ATP Challenger and ITF Futures finals

Doubles: 8 (4–4)

References

External links
 
 

1982 births
Living people
British male tennis players
English male tennis players
US Open (tennis) junior champions
Sportspeople from Newcastle upon Tyne
Tennis people from Tyne and Wear
Grand Slam (tennis) champions in boys' doubles